"Dead in the Water" is the second episode of the eighth season of British television show Midsomer Murders and the thirty seventh episode overall. It stars John Nettles as Detective Chief Inspector Tom Barnaby and John Hopkins as Detective Sergeant Dan Scott. The boating scenes were filmed in Henley, Oxfordshire.

Plot
Barnaby is persuaded by his wife to take a day out at the Midsomer Regatta. He is soon called into action however, when a body appears during a race. He discovers it is Guy Sweetman, a member of the club, and something of a ladies man. Barnaby tries to solve both the murder, and a spate of robberies in the area, which ultimately prove to be connected.

References

Midsomer Murders episodes
2004 British television episodes